Ranunculus glacialis, the glacier buttercup or glacier crowfoot, is a plant of the family Ranunculaceae. It is a 5-10(-20) cm high perennial herb. Often with a single relatively large (1.8 - 3.8 cm) flower, with 5 petals first white later pink or reddish. The underside of the 5 sepals are densely brown-hairy. The leaves are fleshy, shiny, and deeply loped, forming 3 leaflets. Ranunculus glacialis reported (from Greenland material) to have a diploid chromosome number of 2n =  16.

Distribution and habitat 
Ranunculus glacialis is an Arctic–alpine species, found in the high mountains of southern Europe (Alps, Pyrenees, Carpathians, Sierra Nevada) as well as on the Scandinavian peninsula, Iceland, the Faroe Islands, Jan Mayen, Svalbard, eastern Greenland and Finland, where is endangered and protected.

It has been described as being one of the highest-ascending plant in the Alps, flowering at over 4,000 m.

It is found in fell-field and snow-bed sites, on edges of meltwater streams.

Subspecies 
Several subspecies are described.

One subspecies, Ranunculus glacialis subsp. chamissonis, is found on either side of the Bering Strait in Siberia, Russia and Alaska, U.S..

Further reading 

 Totland, Ø., & Alatalo, J. M. (2002). Effects of temperature and date of snowmelt on growth, reproduction, and flowering phenology in the arctic/alpine herb, Ranunculus glacialis. Oecologia, 133(2), 168–175. https://doi.org/10.1007/s00442-002-1028-z
 Wagner, J., Steinacher, G., & Ladinig, U. (2010). Ranunculus glacialis L.: successful reproduction at the altitudinal limits of higher plant life. Protoplasma, 243(1-4), 117–128. https://doi.org/10.1007/s00709-009-0104-1

References 

glacialis
Alpine flora
Flora of Europe
Flora of Greenland
Flora of Iceland
Flora of Siberia
Flora of Alaska
Medicinal plants
Plants described in 1753
Taxa named by Carl Linnaeus
Flora without expected TNC conservation status

ru:Беквичия ледниковая#Название